Mohlakeng is a community council located in the Maseru District of Lesotho. Its population in 2006 was 18,906.

Villages
The community of Mohlakeng includes the villages of Aupolasi, Falatsa, Ha 'Mamahatisa, Ha Borane ('Malikhamane), Ha Chopho, Ha Foto, Ha Katu, Ha Khoeli, Ha Kobefu, Ha Lebakae, Ha Lebamang, Ha Lechesa, Ha Lekete, Ha Lekopa, Ha Lesoli, Ha Lihanela, Ha Liile, Ha Limo, Ha Luka, Ha Luka (Airport), Ha Mafisa, Ha Mahlelebe, Ha Mahlelebe (Hukung), Ha Mak'hoba, Ha Makhori, Ha Mapeshoane, Ha Maqhobela, Ha Matete (Qhuqhu), Ha Matsoake, Ha Mofoka, Ha Mohaka, Ha Mohlakaso, Ha Moholobela, Ha Mokoena, Ha Mokuoane, Ha Mosaeea, Ha Motente, Ha Mothetsi (Thoteng), Ha Mothibe, Ha Motlepu, Ha Mphoto, Ha Ngoatonyane, Ha Nkhabi, Ha Nko, Ha Nkoetla, Ha Phoheli, Ha Raboshabane, Ha Ralisene, Ha Ramohajane, Ha Ramokotjo, Ha Rampoetsi, Ha Rantšetse, Ha Rasebesoane, Ha Sefuli, Ha Setenane, Ha Setoaba, Ha Seturumane, Ha Takalimane, Ha Talinyana, Ha Taole, Ha Thabiso, Ha Thakali, Ha Tlebere, Ha Tšeana, Ha Tšiu, Koma-Koma, Maholong (Ha Mothetsi), Makoaeleng, Manganeng, Meru-Metšo, Mokunutlung, Molumong (Ha Mofoka), Mothating, Nkoeng, Patisanong, Qhomane (Ha Mofoka), Qhuqhu, Ramaqhanyane, Sekoting, Telle and Tholang.

References

External links
 Google map of community villages

Populated places in Maseru District